Redmi A1 and Redmi A1+ are Android-based smartphone designed, marketed and manufactured by Xiaomi sub-brand Redmi. They were announced on September 6, 2022 and they were released on September 9, 2022. Smartphones have a Mediatek Helio A22 processor, Leather Design and 8MP dual camera. Redmi A1+ has a fingerprint sensor.

Redmi A1 is the first Redmi smartphone since Redmi Go that runs on Android Go.

In India Redmi A1+ was introduced as Poco C50 with 2 color options with darker blue color.

Design 

The front is made of glass. The back is made of plastic with a leather texture.

The design of the camera island is similar to Xiaomi Mi 11.

On the bottom side there are microUSB and audio jack ports and a microphone. On the top side there is a speaker. On the left side there is dual SIM tray with microSD slot. On the right side there are a volume rocker and a power button.

Redmi A1 and A1+ have in 3 color options: Black, Light Blue and Light Green.

Poco C50 has 2 color options: Royal Blue and Country Green.

References

Exrernal links 

 
 

Android (operating system) devices
Phablets
A1
Mobile phones with multiple rear cameras
Mobile phones introduced in 2022